Dim Zupan (born 19 February 1946) is a Slovene children's writer. He has also published three novels for adult readers.

Zupan was born in Ljubljana in 1946. He studied Law at the University of Ljubljana. He published his first children's book in 1991, introducing the characters of Drekec Pekec and Pukec Smukec (Super Pooper and Farty Party) which became very popular with young readers and feature in a further four of his books. He has also published over twenty other books, including three novels and a theatre play.

In 1996 he received the Levstik Award for his books Drekec Pekec in Pukec Smukec (Super Pooper and Farty Party) and Leteči mački (Flying Cats).

Published works 
 For young children
  (Little Tooth on Holiday), 1995
  (The Year of the Robber), 1995
  (The Revenge of the Terrible Soup), 1997

 Young adult literature
  (Three Days in the Lives of Super Pooper and Farty Party), 1991
  (The Trnovo Mafia), 1992
  (Three Nights in the Lives of Super Pooper and Farty Party), 1993
  (Three Secrets of Super Pooper and Farty Party), 1994
  (Three Stars of Super Pooper and Farty Party), 1995
  (Flying Cats), 1996
  (The Trnovo Mafia Again), 1997
  (Three Realizations of Super Pooper and Farty Party), 1998
  (Red Hellebore), 1998
  (Beyond the Silver Rainbow), 1998
  (The Blue Stone of Wisdom), 1999
  (the Land of Severed Heads), 2001
  (Maya the Wasp), 2004
  (When the Little Angels Come), 2004
  (Fourteen and a Half), 2005
  (Hector and Fish Fate), 2006
  (Hector and Prep School), 2007
  (The Little Girl Behind the Mirror), 2007
  (Hector and the Great Adventure), 2009
  (Hector and a Little Love), 2009
  (White Night in the Black Village), 2009

 Adult fiction
  (The Dark Star of Death), 1993
  (Velvet Shining), 2000 
  (The Terrible Abyss), 2005

References

Slovenian children's writers
Living people
Writers from Ljubljana
1946 births
Levstik Award laureates
University of Ljubljana alumni